Zephyrium or Zephyrion, also called Zephyrium on the Calycadnus to differentiate it from other towns called Zephyrium, was a town of ancient Cilicia on the Calycadnus River near its mouth, on a promontory of the same name.

Its site is located near the mouth of the Calycadnus in Asiatic Turkey.

References

Populated places in ancient Cilicia
Former populated places in Turkey
History of Mersin Province
Roman Paphlagonia